Waterlow is a surname. Notable people with the surname include:
Caroline Waterlow, American film producer
Claude Waterlow Ferrier (1879–1935), Scottish architect, who specialised in the Art Deco style
David Waterlow (1857–1924), British Liberal Party politician and businessman
Ernest Waterlow RA (1850–1919), English painter
John Waterlow (1916–2010), British physiologist who specialised in childhood malnutrition
Nick Waterlow, curator at the Ivan Dougherty Gallery in Sydney, Australia until his death in November 2009
Sir Sydney Waterlow, 1st Baronet, KCVO (1822–1906), English philanthropist and politician
Sydney Waterlow (diplomat) (1878–1944), British diplomat, Ambassador to Greece from 1933 to 1939
Waterlow baronets created for members of the Waterlow family, both in the Baronetage of the United Kingdom

See also
Waterlow and Sons, major worldwide engraver of currency, postage stamps, stocks and bond certificates, based in England, currently a dormant company
Waterlow Park, 26-acre (11 ha) park in the south east of Highgate Village, in North London
Waterlow score (or Waterlow scale) gives an estimated risk for the development of a pressure sore in a given patient
Waterloo (disambiguation)